Natalia Boa Vista  is a fictional character on the CBS crime drama CSI: Miami, portrayed by actress Eva LaRue.

Background 
Little is known about the character's background prior to her association with the Federal Bureau of Investigation (FBI) and Miami-Dade Police Department (MDPD). In the Season 5 episode "Darkroom", it is revealed that Natalia has at least two younger sisters, Anya and Christine. She was married to Nick Townsend (played by actor Rob Estes) and later divorced him due to his abusive nature. In a flashback scene during the Season 8 opener, it is revealed that the character had first met Horatio Caine in 1997 during her stint with the FBI.

Natalia is a DNA analyst initially assigned only to work on unsolved or cold cases, though this is, until the end of season four, a cover for her. Following the end of her undercover assignment in the season 4 finale, Natalia resigns from the FBI and joins the MDPD, becoming a CSI Level 1. She was later promoted to Level 2 between seasons 6 and 7.

Career
At the end of season four, it is revealed that the character Natalia is an FBI informant in the lab, assigned to help build a case against the lead character Horatio Caine and his team. However, when questioned by her co-workers, she claims to have only reported information that made the Miami-Dade Crime Lab look good.

It is eventually revealed that the negative information that was soiling the lab in fact came from another source, state attorney Monica West and Natalia's claims of defending the lab's integrity were accurate. Although the CSIs and other workers treat her with suspicion and some ostracize them after she's revealed to be the mole, she is ultimately accepted as a permanent above-board member of the team. It is revealed in the Season 8 premiere that Caine (then a homicide detective) had previously met her, she had copied a blood drop for him in 1997.

In episode 508, "Darkroom", CSI' character Ryan Wolfe finds a stash of photographed girls. Natalia discovers that one of the pictures is of her sister Anya. DNA from a crime scene reveals that Anya is indeed one of the women that the CSIs are looking for. It is also revealed that, in addition to Anya, Natalia has another sister named Cristine. At the end of the episode, Horatio manages to locate and rescue Anya, and the sisters are happily reunited. Actress Eva LaRue's sister Nika was offered the role of Anya, the character's sister, but she declined. Instead, the real life sibling played the role of a reporter. In fact, the episode was based on the real-life convicted serial killer William Richard Bradford; Nika LaRue was one of the women photographed by Bradford for his collection. She was no. 3 (out of 54 women) on the poster, created by the LAPD. Bradford would photograph women he met in bars under the guise that he would assist their modeling careers.

In the episode "Internal Affairs", Nick Townsend is found murdered. Natalia had secretly begun seeing Nick again and admitted later in the episode that their relationship was "complicated." All the evidence is pointing to Natalia as the killer. Horatio, the night-shift lab and the character (Calleigh's ex-boyfriend Detective) Jake Berkeley must find evidence to clear Natalia. Natalia admits to Berkeley that she was outside Nick's house. She was handcuffed by Jake at the beginning of the episode. Earlier on, Nick and Valera went on a lunch date. Valera ignored Natalia's warnings about Nick being dangerous, so Natalia went there to watch over her. She sees Nick trying to force Valera into the bedroom and watches Valera push him and run out of the house. Thinking that she killed Nick, Valera tries to admit to Jake, but he denies her confession. It is later discovered that another man murdered Nick over a pair of earrings that Nick had stolen from a crime scene (which linked the man's wife to said crime). At the end of the episode, Natalia leans on Horatio's shoulder and sobs quietly as they both look at a picture of Nick and Natalia in happier days, a reminder that Nick had not always been the abusive person he had become.

In the episode "Tunnel Vision", Natalia is late to a crime scene and explains to Calleigh that she "had to add a new accessory to her wardrobe." She shows that she finally passed the firearms exam and now carries a Glock 26.

In the season 8 episode, "Count Me Out", Natalia and Ryan walk into a booby-trapped house containing a meth lab. As the lab explodes, Natalia is trapped beneath debris. Though telling Ryan to save himself, Ryan stays and tries to free her. Along with Horatio who arrives (Ryan called him just before entering the house), they free Natalia and Horatio helps her to safety. Though claiming to be fine and not willing to admit her injury, Natalia experiences hearing problems towards the end of the episode as well as flashbacks of the explosion, showing how shaken she truly is.

Later in "Die By the Sword", Natalia's hearing problem almost costs her life while searching a victim's house. The victim's son, spooked by officers invading his house takes a samurai sword and sneaks up on Natalia. Not hearing the boy, Natalia continues to search through a closet. Just before the boy [Kenny Turner] strikes, Ryan sees him and shouts to Natalia. Kenny runs but is caught by Tripp. Afterwards Natalia thanks Ryan for "having her back". Ryan, on the other hand is furious that she was almost killed and urges her to see a doctor. Later, Walter gives her the card of a good doctor and after expressing her fear of being "stuck behind a desk" for the rest of her career she agrees to go see the doctor.

After a series of tests, it is concluded that Natalia had a preexisting injury, caused through domestic violence. she has then prescribed a hearing aid that assists in a case when it picks up a signal jammer hidden in a plant.

In the same episode, Natalia (through her hearing aid) also discovers Eric is wearing a wire and quizzes him over it, saying she knows what it means due to her past "mole" experience. She agrees to keep his secret, but is crestfallen as she sees Eric's reaction to her overly warm admonishment to "please be careful". They'd been lovers in the past and clearly it was a relationship that Eric didn't want to return to as, not wanting to confuse her or lead her on, he quickly exits her company. Her lingering feelings for him tears at their friendship when later that evening she refuses to go for after work drinks with the team because of his presence with new love Calleigh Duquesne.

In "All Fall Down", the season 9 opener, Natalia falls victim to a poison attack in the lab, her survival was uncertain until the season 9 premiere. She did survive thanks to Horatio's intervention, and is devastated when she unsuccessfully attempted to revive Jesse, who died while falling. She plays an active part in his murder case, trying to warn Melissa (PhD student of Sterling, the killer) about him. She also helps Eric and Horatio decipher hieroglyphic symbols left by the killer. She later participated in a basketball game with Walter and the rest of the CSIs.

In "Sleepless in Miami", Natalia goes undercover to investigate a psychic that was linked to a case involving someone who dreamed about a murder victim. The psychic saw the listening device attached to her hearing aid that Natalia was using so Ryan could record the interaction. The psychic drugged Natalia using a laced candle that Natalia was to breathe from, then had her drive to an abandoned warehouse to draw Wolfe and Caine away from the psychic while she fled. Natalia, believing she was back at the lab and seeing Nick (her deceased ex-husband) trying to attack her, attempted to fire at "Nick", not realizing it was actually Lt. Caine and Det. Wolfe. She was then hospitalized for the drugging, not remembering the incident other than that it was dream-like. Horatio and Ryan later removed any evidence that Natalia had used her firearm to fire at fellow MDPD officers, without her knowledge, saying that no one could be allowed to know.

In "Happy Birthday", Natalia shows confidence while investigating the case and a true member of the team when Horatio uses physical force to interrogate a suspect. Though not quite comfortable with the situation, she entered the Hummer instead of leaving when Horatio gave her an out; looking out for bystanders when the suspect cries out when Horatio leans down on his dislocated shoulder.

In "F-T-F", Natalia learns from a new trace tech that she was a case study at the local university. She also shows superiority and a scientific knowledge when showing the tech how to analyze a piece of evidence. She and Walter also set up a meeting with a suspect who believes they are a teenage girl over the internet. She and Ryan then catch the suspect, who waited for Eric and Horatio at the set-up.

In "About Face", Natalia gives a speech warning students at Miami Dade University to be on the look out for alleged cyber killer Patrick Clarkson. While walking to her Hummer, she is kidnapped by Clarkson who begs for her to prove his innocence. Natalia manages to escape her binds in the back of Clarkson's van as he is driving and fights him, causing the van to topple down a slope. She is rescued by Horatio but Clarkson escapes. Natalia then goes through evidence with Ryan Wolfe, Calleigh Duquesne and Eric Delko as she wonders if Clarkson was telling the truth, while her colleagues worry if it is a form of post traumatic stress disorder and realizes that Clarkson is in fact innocent, and is therefore able to convict the real murderer. At the end of the episode, Natalia watches sadly as Clarkson is taken to jail for her kidnapping. She sustained a broken arm and a wound on her forehead and cheek from her kidnapping.

In "Mayday", Natalia discovers a connection between escapee serial killer Jack Toller and Randy North, a man she arrested yet helped four years ago. After discovering Randy has had further contact with Toller, he is summoned to a hearing to decide whether he should keep custody of his two children. Randy begs Natalia to defend him at the hearing, which she tries but her attempts are hindered by a state attorney. Randy continues to beg her to help him get his children back, but Natalia is called to continue investigating the case. At the end of the ninth-season finale, Horatio Caine is shot in the stomach while Natalia is locked in the trunk of a car by Randy, which is then set in motion, rolling into the ocean. Even as the car is sinking she's trying desperately to call out for help using her cell phone however, it seems that none of the calls were going through suggesting they were both in an area without cell phone service.

In the tenth-season premiere, Natalia is saved by Horatio, who managed to get to his feet in time and dive into the water to save her, even though he was also seriously wounded and ended up being saved by her. Despite feeling shell-shocked by the event, and lamenting at all the close calls she had the previous year, Natalia manages to pull herself together when Wolfe encouraged her to not give up. She continues working on the case, getting North to divulge a way to get in contact with Toller so they could capture him and bring him to justice.

Relationships 
Despite her initial assignment to "spy" on the lab, Natalia soon befriends the rest of the team and sends positive reports about them.

Natalia and co-worker Eric Delko previously dated. Later on, they broke up because of a pregnancy scare (episode 415, Skeletons). It was also subtly suggested that Natalia had slept with Eric to get information on the lab (episode 425, One of Our Own). Even if that was true, Eric remains protective of Natalia when her ex-husband Nick intrudes into crime scenes and harasses her.

In the episode titled Throwing Heat Natalia always asks if Eric is all right and teases him. In the two-part episode, No Man's Land and Man Down, when Eric is shot, Natalia is very worried and mentions to the character Detective Frank Tripp that Eric is all she can think about now.

In season 5, Natalia is now a CSI trainee. But to her grief and misery, Natalia discovers that her ex-husband is out of prison, and he serves her a restraining order. Nick begins working for a private crime-scene cleanup company. The situation is difficult, as Natalia is forced to make terms with Nick so that he would drop the restraining order. In the episode If Looks Could Kill Natalia tells Nick to leave when he enters the CSI office. Nick says that the restraining order that she filed against him has expired.

In episode 510, "Come As You Are", Natalia is shocked to find out that Nick had successfully asked Maxine Valera on a date. 

In season 6, episode 605, Deep Freeze, it is revealed that the aftereffects of Nick breaking Natalia's arm is the reason she can't use a shotgun. After she dislocates her arm, Eric Delko puts it back in. This, and the chain of events that occur, results in Calleigh and Jake's possible break-up. Later in the season, Natalia uncovered a corrupt FBI agent and how an extramarital affair led to the death of a young woman, for which the FBI agent was arrested.

Natalia and teammate Calleigh Duquesne share a good friendship, being the only two women on the CSI team. It is mostly seen when the two are paired up for crime scene investigations. In season 6 Kill Switch, the two banter and joke while having to search an entire beach for a drug stash. When Natalia passes her fire-arms exam (Season 6, Tunnel Vision) Calleigh is the first she tells due to being late to the crime scene. Again the two share laughs.

When Calleigh is hospitalized and fighting for her life, Natalia shows concern for her friend, which Calleigh returns in Season 9's Sleepless in Miami. While Natalia is unconscious, Calleigh remains by her side, gently coaching her friend to wake up and assuring and comforting her when Natalia is startled and confused by what happened. The two also share a friendly chat and joking banter while investigating in Season 9's Match Made In Hell.

It is mentioned that CSI Ryan Wolfe is attracted to her. He was considering asking her out after she came to visit him at a crime scene. They had one date in Season 4, with Ryan going as far as asking Eric's "permission" to date her, but it's clear she was 'not as into him as he was into her,' so they ultimately choose to keep their relationship professional. In spite of this, it is obvious that Natalia became more protective of Ryan and cares about him and being the only one who believes him when the others CSIs doubt him. In Season 8, Wolfe shows mild concern about Natalia's hearing loss from an explosion in a Meth Lab. He urges her to go see a doctor. In season 9, episode 1, after Jesse Cardoza is killed, the CSI's play a game of basketball to honor him. Natalia and Ryan Wolfe play on different teams, but are often seen playing together, even hugging in the middle of the game.  In season 9 "Sleepless in Miami", Natalia goes undercover, whilst Ryan listens to the conversation through Natalia's ear piece outside. Natalia falls victim to the physic, who drugs her and makes her believe here ex-husband, Nick, is back to kill her. When Horatio and Ryan track Natalia down to a warehouse, she thinks they are Nick and fires her gun at them. Ryan manages to tackle Natalia to the ground, disarming her and keeps hold as she cries out in distress. Later, when she is released from hospital and back at the lab, he offers to take her home. Using the keys she gave him, Ryan and Horatio sneak into Natalia's locker, replacing her gun and making a pact to never mention a word of Natalia shooting at them to anyone, including Natalia. Ryan then heads out to drive her home. Ryan and Natalia's prospective relationship is impeded by the introduction of the new lab technician Molly Sloan, who clearly shows an interest in Ryan. In episode 9x18, Molly asks Ryan out for coffee and he complies. After Molly leaves the room, Ryan turns and takes a long look at Natalia, clearly conflicted. In this same episode, Ryan worriedly calls Natalia four times, and this is mocked by Eric Delko before they realize that she is kidnapped.

In season 4, Natalia is held at gunpoint (Urban Hellraisers) by two gunmen who storm the lab. Just before a gunman is about to apparently shoot her, Horatio Caine appears, saving her life. In Collision Natalia confides in Horatio that she knows their Jane Doe victim, because the vic belongs to an under-ground railroad for abused women, even though it's against the railroads rules. This ends up being a case breaker. Horatio shows concern for her, making sure she is okay with the information being used in the case and thanking her for trusting him.

Despite having betrayed the lab by acting as the 'mole' (One of Our Own), Horatio did not fire Natalia, but surprisingly making her a CSI, a very unpopular choice. Through her process and development, he's often guided her, watching out and caring when her sister was kidnapped in Season 5's Darkroom, after a frightful mini explosion in the lab that Natalia's subjected to (Curse of the Coffin) and when her abusive ex-husband Nick returns to torment her in If Looks Could Kill.

Also, when suspected of Nick's murder in Internal Affairs, Horatio comforts Natalia, letting her know he wouldn't listen to any rumors about her and also helping her grieve once the killer is caught. In season 9, Horatio and Ryan track Natalia after she's drugged (Sleepless in Miami). Despite having his gun drawn, Horatio does not fire at Natalia, though she does pose a threat to his and Ryan's safety.

In Happy Birthday, Natalia is an uncomfortable witness when she sees Horatio man-handling a suspect, though she doesn't mention it to anyone. Despite this, in Match Made In Hell, the two share a nice conversation while waiting for the suspect to show, both laughing like friends, a rare sight from the Lieutenant.

In season 8, Natalia makes plans with Jesse Cardoza to go out for drinks after work. However, after Jesse stands her up (to watch over a woman he feared was in danger) their relationship hits a rocky point. Natalia wishing not to partner up when she, Jesse, Ryan and Calleigh are knocking door-to-door in Count Me Out. Later in the episode, when talking with Walter, Jesse comments "Boa Vista was in a explosion and she's still standing," admiring her strength. Since then the two share a neutral friendship, working peacefully together. In the season 9 opener Fallen, Natalia awakes after the lab poisoning unharmed, but cries out as she finds Jesse, wide-eyed and not breathing. She screams for help as she desperately tried to revive him, but is pulled into Horatio's comforting arms as they realize Jesse is dead.

Though rarely seen talking or working together in Season 8, throughout Season 9, Walter Simmons and Natalia seem to have a light, connective friendship. In Reality Kills Walter tells her random facts he learned about the Statue of Liberty, while Natalia jokingly 'begs' for him to continue. He nicknames her "BV" and often calls her that. In F-T-F the two are paired up countless times while investigating, and playfully joke when re-acting the crime scene at the lab. Later in the episode, the two are search a suspect's house and use the computer to set up a meeting with a suspect who believes Walter is a teenage girl. They joke while on the computer.

Notes

CSI: Miami characters
Fictional Federal Bureau of Investigation personnel
Fictional forensic scientists
Fictional Miami-Dade Police Department detectives
Television characters introduced in 2005